Ferda (means "Ferdinand the Ant", translated as Ferdy/Ferdi outside of the Czech Republic and Slovakia) is a Czech literary and comics character, an anthropomorphic ant created by Ondřej Sekora, who both wrote and illustrated the stories. It was first published in 1933 in the Lidové noviny (folk news) newspaper. The character appeared in many Czech children 

Knížka Ferdy Mravence (book of Ferdinand the Ant), which unites three previous books: Ferda Mravenec (1936), Ferda Mravenec v cizích službách (1937, Ferdinand the Ant in foreign services) and Ferda v mraveništi (1938, Ferdinand in the anthill). Many smaller books about Ferda were published along with an animated TV series which premiered in 1984.

References 

Czech books
Czech comics
Czech comics characters
Comics characters introduced in 1933
1933 comics debuts
Fictional ants
Fantasy comics
Comics about animals
Comics adapted into animated series
Comics adapted into television series
Male characters in comics